Below are the rosters for the 2005 South American Youth Championship tournament held in Colombia. The ten national teams involved in the tournament were required to register a squad of 20 players; only players in these squads are eligible to take part in the tournament.

Players name marked in bold have been capped at full international level.

Argentina

Head coach:  Francisco Ferarro

(Source for player names:)

Chile
Coach: José Sulantay 

(Source for player names:)

Uruguay
Coach: Gustavo Ferrín 

(Source for player names:)

References

South American U-20 Championship squads